Frank Bretti is an American former ice hockey head coach who previously headed the program at Iona.

Career
Bretti began coaching at his alma mater in 1990 as an assistant before advancing to the Division I level with a similar position at Alaska-Anchorage in 1993. Bretti was not retained when head coach Brush Christiansen retired in 1996 but he was back behind the bench at Iona by 1997, this time as head coach. Bretti replaced Bill Conforte after a 2-win season and while his first year in charge resulted in only 2 more wins Iona was poised to make the jump to the D-I ranks.

Iona was one of three full-time Metro Atlantic Athletic Conference schools to have a hockey program in existence in 1998 when the conference formed an ice hockey division and was thus promoted to Division-I status. Despite their poor showings in recent years Iona played fairly well under Bretti, finishing as a middle-of-the-pack team most years and reaching the conference tournament final in 2000. Unfortunately by 2003 the financial cost of the program caused the board of trustees to drop the program entirely and Bretti was once more out of a job.

A year later Bretti was back in the college ranks as an assistant at Rensselaer, staying for two seasons. He has most recently been the head coach for the New York Apple Core junior program.

Head coaching record

College

References

External links

Year of birth missing (living people)
Living people
American ice hockey coaches
Alaska Anchorage Seawolves men's ice hockey coaches
Iona Gaels men's ice hockey coaches
RPI Engineers men's ice hockey coaches